Zosis is a genus of spiders in the family Uloboridae.

Species
, the World Spider Catalog accepted 5 species:
Zosis costalimae (Mello-Leitão, 1917) – Brazil
Zosis geniculata (Olivier, 1789) – Southern USA to Brazil, Caribbean. Introduced to Macaronesia, West Africa, Seychelles, India, Indonesia, Philippines, China, Korea, Japan, Australia, Hawaii
Zosis geniculata fusca (Caporiacco, 1948) – Guyana
Zosis geniculata timorensis (Schenkel, 1944) – Timor
Zosis peruana (Keyserling, 1881) – Colombia to Argentina

References

Uloboridae
Araneomorphae genera
Spiders of South America
Pantropical spiders